Frini Eveline Adelka Spanner (born 25 September 1958 Sint Eustatius) is a Sint Eustatian politician and leader of the Democratic Party (DP). She is a member of the Island Council of Sint Eustatius.

Spanner was born on Sint Eustatius, which was then part of the former Netherlands Antilles, on 25 September 1958. She has worked in the island's public administration.

Adelka Spanner won re-election to the five-member Island Council in the 2020 Sint Eustatius general election. She was one of two members of the Democratic Party elected to the council in 2020 (alongside Nicolaas “Koos” Sneek), while three seats were won by the governing Progressive Labour Party. Spanner and the other members were inaugurated on 29 October 2020. Spanner was appointed Vice Chairperson of the council's Central Committee during the term.

On 26 April 2021 Spanner was one of seven Statia residents to receive a 2021 Royal Decoration on behalf of King Willem-Alexander of the Netherlands.

References

Living people
1958 births
Members of the Island Council of Sint Eustatius
Sint Eustatius women in politics
Sint Eustatius politicians
Democratic Party (Sint Eustatius) politicians